The São José church is an eclectic-style church with Neo-Gothic influence located in downtown Belo Horizonte, Minas Gerais, Brazil. It was built by the Redemptorist congregation.

History 
The groundbreaking took place on 20 April 1902, as a result of the invitation of the bishop of the then Diocese of Mariana, Dom Silvério Gomes Pimenta, for the Dutch Redemptorist missionaries to assume the pastoral work in the São José Parish, which had been recently inaugurated on 27 January 1900.

The chosen place for the construction of the new church was on the hill between Tamoios and Espírito Santo Streets, facing Afonso Pena Avenue. It began to be used for religious functions in 1904. Its main staircase, designed and built by Verenfrido Vogels, was completed in 1910. The interior paintings, by German painter Guilherme Schumacher, were finished between 1911 and 1912. Its architecture was designed by Edgard Nascentes Coelho and the works were directed by Dutch Redemptorist Gregório Mulders.

Description 
The church adopted the basilica plan, with three naves and polygonal apses in the transept. The interior decoration includes eight paintings on the central nave featuring the life of Saint Joseph. In the chancel there is a representation of the Holy Trinity on the main axis, flanked by figures of kings, queens, bishops, men and women, and a court of angels. On the sides it has paintings representing the twelve signs.

Gallery

References 

Roman Catholic churches in Belo Horizonte